Prince Xiang of the First Rank, or simply Prince Xiang, was the title of a princely peerage used in China during the Manchu-led Qing dynasty (1644–1912). As the Prince Xiang peerage was not awarded "iron-cap" status, this meant that each successive bearer of the title would normally start off with a title downgraded by one rank vis-à-vis that held by his predecessor. However, the title would generally not be downgraded to any lower than a feng'en fuguo gong except under special circumstances.

The sole bearer of the title was Bombogoor (20 January 1642 – 22 August 1656), the Hong Taiji's 11th son, who was made "Prince Xiang of the First Rank" in 1655. Bombogoor died without an heir and had not adopted any children, leaving the peerage extinct. Bombogor was honoured with the title "Prince Xiangzhao of the First Rank" (和硕襄昭亲王, "xiangzhao" meaning "helpful and luminous").

Family of Bomubogor 

 Primary Consort, of the Khorchin Borjigin clan
 5 mistresses

Ancestry

References

Hong Taiji's sons
Extinct Qing dynasty princely peerages